Ian Harshman (September 13, 1975 – August 19, 2021), better known by his stage name Ian Carey, was an American house DJ, musician, and record producer based in Miami, Florida.

Biography
Carey grew up in Hancock, Maryland, graduating from Hancock Middle-Senior High School in 1993. His father was a live sound engineer and ran a sound reinforcement company; he had engineered for such groups as Kool & The Gang and The Duke Ellington Orchestra.

Carey became involved with dance music while in college. He had already experimented with the graffiti-writing scene in Baltimore, where he met a number of hip-hop DJs, which led to him becoming involved in DJing. He was also introduced to house music while working at a record store. The success of Carey's first self-produced single "Rise" later influenced him to move to Europe to pursue a career in dance music production. 

Carey performed as a disc jockey since 1993 and worked as a record producer since 1998. Working with Jason Papillon (see DJ Jason Brooks) as part of Soul Providers, their first single, "Rise", peaked within the top 60 of the charts in the United Kingdom.

Suffering from depression, and unhappy with the house music scene in America, Carey moved to the Netherlands from the US in 2003 and then on to Spain in 2006. In 2008, Ian Carey released the song "Get Shaky" (released as The Ian Carey Project), which featured the vocals of American singer-songwriter Kelly Barnes, who also co-wrote the song. "Get Shaky" peaked within the top ten of the charts in Australia, Belgium, New Zealand, and the United Kingdom. In the former country, "Get Shaky" peaked at number two on the ARIA Singles Chart in January 2009, while in the latter country, "Get Shaky" became Carey's second charting song on the UK Singles Chart and first top ten hit on the listing, peaking at number nine in August 2009. The song achieved Double Platinum certification in Australia and Gold certification in New Zealand. The song also won the award for Best Dance Video at the MTV Australia Awards 2009. It also reached the top ten and was world champion Czech Republic's official goal song at the IIHF Ice Hockey World Cup in Germany. In 2011 Ian collaborated with Snoop Dogg and Bobby Anthony on his single "Last Night" which was also remixed by Afrojack. 

Ian was based in Miami but spent much of the year touring 
internationally. On August 19, 2021, Carey died from unknown causes at the age of 45.

Discography

As lead artist

Awards
MTV Music Video Awards Australia
2009 Best Dance Video – "Get Shaky"

References

External links
 

1975 births
2021 deaths
Remixers
DJs from Miami
American house musicians
American electronic musicians
American electronic dance music DJs